Vashtie Kola (often stylized as Va$htie; born April 23, 1981) is an American music video director, filmmaker, artist, designer, creative consultant and disc jockey. She has been active in the downtown New York City scene for over a decade.

Early life
She moved to New York City in 1999 to attend the School of Visual Arts, where she studied film. She graduated in 2004. During this time, she worked at Stüssy, a clothing store.

Career

Kola and Anthony Mandler were both hired by Box Fresh Pictures as directors in 2005. Her very first videos, including those for artists like Beans, J-Status, and Tony Hussle, were produced by this company. At the same time she was also writing music video treatments for established directors such as Anthony Mandler, Lenny Bass and Dr. Teeth. She wrote the treatment for Common's video "Testify" which starred Taraji P. Henson and Wood Harris. During the same time, Kola styled and modeled for the clothing line Billionaire Boys Club.

Kola was asked to revamp the company of Island Def Jam as director of creative services in 2006. Antonio "L.A" Reid, president of Def Jam, said she would be "the one to keep the building cool, someone in tune with downtown cool and pop mainstream." That year Kola also started an monthly '90s party with her friend Oscar Sanchez called "1992". Playing only music from the late '80s and early '90s, the event brought out a mix of tastemakers and celebrities including Dave Chappelle, Jay-Z, Ne-Yo, Jermaine Dupri, Patrick Ewing, Redman, DJ Premier, The Clipse, Maxwell, Chanel Iman, Zoe Kravitz, Grand Puba, Lord Finesse, and KiD CuDi. Although its residency is in New York City, the party has taken place in Miami, Paris and Amsterdam. In 2008, 1992 was nominated for Best Party at the Paper Magazine Nightlife Awards and also received press in The New York Post, i-D, Trace, Paper, and a feature in The New York Times.

Kola started her own clothing line, Violette. With an official debut in fall 2008, the clothing was described as "a mix of opposite worlds: uptown and downtown, hip-hop and rock, feminine and masculine, casual and couture". The following year, Vibe listed the "31 Most Stylish People Under 31" with Kola coming in at 23rd. She was also featured in Nylon as part of their lineup of "It Girls". In this year, Kola was interviewed Sean "Diddy" Combs for Supreme Magazine, which was photographed by Terry Richardson, and was included in the Nike Destroyer Campaign alongside Dee & Ricky and Scott Campbell.

In 2010, she modelled for Rachel Roy's spring lookbook. Later that year, she became the first woman to design Nike Air Jordan sneakers. The shoe was offered at select boutiques nationally, most of which sold out in the first few days. Publications including Women's Wear Daily, Footwear News, TeenVogue.Com, Complex, and The Source covered the occasion. In 2011, The New York Times did a feature on Kola.

In 2015, Kola wrote, directed and starred in an art film for Drake's Hotline Bling video. She also starred in the reality documentary television series 3AM, which aired for seven episodes on Showtime.

Videography

2005
 Beans - "Papercut"
 Tony Hussle - "Come Again"

2007
 Child Rebel Soldier - "Us Placers"
 Armand Van Helden - "I Want Your Soul"
 J-Status featuring Shontelle & Rihanna - "Roll It"

2008
 Slim featuring Ryan Leslie & Fabolous - "Good Lovin'"
 KiD CuDi - "Heaven At Nite"

2009
 Solange - "T.O.N.Y."
 Yung L.A. - "Futuristic Love (Elroy)"
 Justin Bieber - "One Time"
 Junior Sanchez featuring Joel Madden & Benji Madden - "Elevator"
 Jadakiss - "Letter to B.I.G."

2010
 Theophilus London - "I Want You (Marvin Gaye Cover)"
 Curt@!n$ - "EXODUS"
 Jasmine Solano – "That's Not It"

2011
 Kendrick Lamar - "A.D.H.D"

2012
 Big K.R.I.T. - "Boobie Miles"
 Big K.R.I.T. - "Insomnia"
 Joey Bada$$ - "Waves"
 Gym Class Heroes - "Martyrial Girl$"

2015
 Drake - "Hotline Bling (Art Version)"
 3AM (TV Series)

References

External links
 
 

1981 births
American women DJs
American designers
American music video directors
Living people
Music promoters
Artists from Albany, New York
21st-century American women musicians
Filmmakers from New York (state)
DJs from New York City
Women music promoters